The 2009 SWATCH FIVB Beach Volleyball World Championships is a beach volleyball event, that was held from June 26 to July 5, 2009 in Stavanger, Norway. The Swatch FIVB World Championships are organized every two years, and Norway is the first Northern European country to host the event. The city of Stavanger had earlier hosted ten Open and Grand Slam events at the SWATCH FIVB World Tour.

The 2009 event was the seventh official edition of the championship, after ten unofficial championships (1987–1996) all held in Rio de Janeiro, Brazil.

The total Prize Money for 2009 was US$1 Million.

Medal summary

Men's competition

Round Robin

Pool A

|}

Pool B

|}

Pool C

|}

Pool D

|}

Pool E

|}

Pool F

|}

Pool G

|}

Pool H

|}

Pool I

|}

Pool J

|}

Pool K

|}

Pool L

|}

Best Third Places

|}

Play-off

Round of 32

|}

Round of 16

|}

Quarterfinals

|}

Semifinals

|}

Bronze medal Match

|}

Gold medal Match

|}

Women's competition

Round Robin

Pool A

|}

Pool B

|}

Pool C

|}

Pool D

|}

Pool E

|}

Pool F

|}

Pool G

|}

Pool H

|}

Pool I

|}

Pool J

|}

Pool K

|}

Pool L

|}

Best Third Places

|}

Play-off

Round of 32

|}

Round of 16

|}

Quarterfinals

|}

Semifinals

|}

Bronze medal Match

|}

Gold medal Match

|}

Final ranking

Women's competition

Men's competition

References

External links
Official site
US Broadcast

2009
C
B
Bea